This list of IIM Calcutta alumni includes notable people who are alumni of Indian Institute of Management Calcutta.

Business
Rohit Chadda, CEO for the digital business at Zee group (Zee Entertainment, Zee Media and DNA); co-founder of foodpanda.com; Fortune 40 under 40
 Sunil Alagh, former MD and CEO of Britannia Industries
 Ajit Balakrishnan, founder and chief executive officer of Rediff.com; chairman of the board of governors of IIM Calcutta
 Vikrant Bhargava, co-founder and group marketing director, PartyGaming
 Ashish Chauhan, managing director and CEO, Bombay Stock Exchange
 Pranay Chulet, co-founder and CEO of Quikr
 Sunil Duggal, chief executive officer of Dabur
 Sabyasachi Hajara, chairman and managing director, Shipping Corporation of India
 Patu Keswani, chairman and managing director of Lemon Tree Hotels
 Shantanu Khosla, MD of Procter & Gamble India
 M. R. Madhavan, president and co-founder of PRS Legislative Research
 P M Murty, former MD and CEO of Asian Paints
 Srinath Narasimhan, managing director and chief executive officer of Tata Teleservices
 T. V. Narendran, MD of Tata Steel
 Indra Nooyi, chairman and chief executive officer, PepsiCo
 Jessie Paul, author and marketer
 Sudhakar Ram, founder and CEO of Mastek
 Shyam Srinivasan, MD and CEO of Federal Bank
 Nishi Vasudeva, chairperson and managing director at Hindustan Petroleum; first woman ever to head a Navratna PSU
 Gopal Vittal, CEO of Bharti Airtel (India)
 Sumant Sinha, founder, chairman and CEO, ReNew Power
 Sanjay Gupta, Country manager of Google

Academics
 Prakash Apte, academician; professor and former director of Indian Institute of Management Bangalore
 B. B. Chakrabarti, former finance professor at IIM Calcutta; current Director of Indian Institute of Management Ranchi (IIM Ranchi)
 Dipesh Chakrabarty, historian
 Anindya Ghose, Heinz Riehl Chair professor and Director of the Masters in Business Analytics degree program at Stern School of Business at New York University
 Dan Gode, professor at New York University
 Ramachandra Guha, historian and author
 Chetan Sankar, Emeritus Professor of Raymond J. Harbert College of Business, Auburn University
 Gita Johar, vice dean for diversity, equity, and inclusion and Meyer Feldberg Professor of Business, Columbia Business School, Columbia University
 Krishna Palepu, professor at Harvard Business School, senior adviser to the president for Global Strategy, Harvard University
 Mohanbir Sawhney, McCormick Tribune Professor of Technology, Kellogg School of Management
Venkatesh Shankar, Coleman Chair Professor of Marketing and director of research at the Center for Retailing Studies at Mays Business School at Texas A&M University
 Paul Shrivastava, David O'Brien Distinguished Professor of Sustainable Enterprise, Concordia University
 Vallabh Sambamurthy, Dean of the Wisconsin School of Business, University of Wisconsin, Madison
 M. J. Xavier, founding director of Indian Institute of Management Ranchi
Ravi Dhar, George Rogers Clark Professor of Management and Marketing and Director of the Center for Customer Insights at the Yale School of Management

Literature
 Swati Kaushal, novelist
 Manreet Sodhi Someshwar, novelist
 Amish Tripathi, novelist, author of the Shiva Trilogy

Government, politics, and social work
 Amolak Rattan Kohli, is a former governor of the Indian state of Mizoram
 Krishnamurthy Subramanian, the 17th Chief Economic Adviser to the Government of India
 Amolak Rathan Kohli, former Governor of Mizoram
 Vinayak Lohani, social entrepreneur, founder of Parivaar
Ajay Bisaria, Indian High Commissioner to Pakistan, former Ambassador to Poland and Lithuania 
Dinesh K. Patnaik, Ambassador of India to the Kingdom of Spain and the Principality of Andorra, former Ambassador to Kingdom of Morocco and to the Kingdom of Cambodia. Dy High Commissioner to the United Kingdom

Spirituality 
  Swami Mukundananda, Spiritual Leader; Bestselling Author; Founder of  JKYog and  Radha Krishna Temple of Dallas

Other 

 Malli Mastan Babu, leading mountaineer; known for his Guinness World record for scaling the seven summits in 172 days in 2006.

References

Indian Institutes of Management alumni
Alumni
Lists of people by university or college in India
Kolkata-related lists